The Pivdennyi Bridge ( - Southern bridge) in Kyiv, Ukraine was designed by the architect A. Gavrilov ("Mostobud") and a group of engineers headed by G. Fux, was built in 1990.

Overview
It is the second metro bridge in Kyiv, serving both the Syretsko-Pecherska metro line and road traffic. The cables holding the spans on the bridge are supported by a ferroconcrete double-column pylon  in height.

The bridge currently has three traffic lanes in both directions (total of six). It connects the Smaller Ring Road around the center of Kyiv. The bridge is part of the E40/M03 and is formally an extension of the local Promyslova Street.

About 1.5 miles north from it is building a new bridge. In 2010 a railway traffic portion of that bridge was finished, while the automobile traffic was scheduled to be established sometime in 2011. The whole project, however, is supposed to end around 2015.

See also
 Bridges in Kyiv

References

External links
  Bridge profile at the International Database and Gallery of Structures
  Bridge profile at skyscraperpage.com
 LIVE Traffic webcamera (eastern portion)

Railroad bridges in Kyiv
Road bridges in Kyiv
Bridges built in the Soviet Union
Kyiv Metro
Bridges completed in 1990
Bridges over the Dnieper
Cable-stayed bridges in Ukraine
European route E40
1990 establishments in Ukraine